Nikita Bylinkin (born 27 January 1999) is a Belarusian professional footballer who plays for Slutsk.

References

External links 
 
 

1999 births
Living people
People from Slutsk
Sportspeople from Minsk Region
Belarusian footballers
Association football defenders
FC Slutsk players
FC Smolevichi players
FC Viktoryja Marjina Horka players
FC Arsenal Dzerzhinsk players